Mixed team

Walter Adolph McCreery (13 August 1871 in Zurich – 8 November 1922 in Clermont-Ferrand) was an American Polo player who competed in the 1900 Summer Olympics. He received the silver medal in the Mixed team event.

Biography
He was privately educated in the United States and then read law at Magdalen College, Cambridge, achieving a second-class degree.

He was the father of General Sir Richard McCreery, a career soldier of the British Army who commanded the British Eighth Army fighting in the Italian campaign from October 1944 until the end of the Second World War.

References

External links

1871 births
1922 deaths
Polo players at the 1900 Summer Olympics
Olympic polo players of the United States
Olympic silver medalists for the United States
Medalists at the 1900 Summer Olympics
Olympic medalists in polo
Sportspeople from Zürich
American people of Swiss descent